Cairngorm or Cairngorms may refer to:

Places
 Cairngorm (Alberta), a mountain in Jasper National Park, Canada
 Cairn Gorm, a mountain in the Scottish Highlands, after which the Cairngorms are named
 Cairngorm Mountain Railway
 Cairngorm Mountain ski resort, a ski and snowboarding recreation area on Cairn Gorm
 Cairngorms, a mountain range in the Scottish Highlands
 Cairngorms National Park, a national park in Cairngorms, Scotland
 Cairngorm Lochs, a protected wetland area in the Cairngorms
 Cairngorm, a community in Strathroy-Caradoc, Ontario, Canada
 Cairngorm Lake, source of the Steel River (Ontario), Canada

Other
 Cairngorm (Flex framework), one of the primary open-source software frameworks for application architecture in Adobe Flex
 Cairngorm (horse) (foaled 1902), an American Thoroughbred racehorse
 Cairngorm (mineral), a form of smoky quartz, found in the Cairngorms
 Cairngorm Brewery, a brewery in Aviemore, Scotland
 Cairngorm Club, a mountaineering club in Aberdeen, Scotland
 The Cairngorms (book}

See also
 Cairn (disambiguation)
 Cairns (disambiguation)
 Loch Gorm Castle